Glenn Stewart is a New Zealand badminton player who competed for New Zealand at the 1986 and 1990 Commonwealth Games.

Stewart with Kerrin Harrison won a bronze in the men's doubles at the 1986 Commonwealth Games, and also won the men's doubles at the 1986 French Open.

References

 Glenn Stewart profile at commonwealthgames.org.nz

External links
 
 
 
 

Badminton players at the 1986 Commonwealth Games
Badminton players at the 1990 Commonwealth Games
Commonwealth Games bronze medallists for New Zealand
New Zealand male badminton players
Living people
Commonwealth Games medallists in badminton
Year of birth missing (living people)
Medallists at the 1986 Commonwealth Games